Novokamenskoye is a rural locality (a selo) in Novoalexandrovskoye Rural Settlement, Suzdalsky District, Vladimir Oblast, Russia. The population was 135 as of 2010. There are 5 streets.

Geography 
Novokamenskoye is located 23 km southwest of Suzdal (the district's administrative centre) by road. Tsibeyevo is the nearest rural locality.

References 

Rural localities in Suzdalsky District